Gates of Vienna is a far-right blog  established in 2003 by Edward S. May and his wife. The website has featured the writings of international anti-Muslim writers such as Fjordman and Paul Weston, and "is a central player in the counter-jihad movement within the United States and across Europe".

The first blog entry was published on Blogspot in January 2003 by Baron Bodissey, a pseudonym used by May, along with his wife who wrote as Dymphna, and was run from Virginia, United States. The name of the blog comes from the 1683 battle of Vienna, in which the Polish and Austrian armies defeated the invading Turkish Ottomans, framed by the blog as a fight between Christianity and Islam. May also writes as Ned May, and describes himself as a "computer programmer with some outlandish right-wing political ideas". May has later participated in numerous "counter-jihad" conferences, has been on the board of directors of the International Free Press Society, and was the director of the International Civil Liberties Alliance. He was "the principal organizer of the international counter-jihad movement from 2006-2011". The blog was investigated by the FBI after the 2011 Norway attacks as it was revealed that it was one of the most cited websites in the manifesto of Anders Behring Breivik. May has later said that the attack, which he condemned, has been used to try to "shut down" criticism of Islam and Sharia.

The website features a banner that promotes the books and activities of anti-Muslim and far-right figures such as Geert Wilders, Elisabeth Sabaditsch-Wolff and Tommy Robinson.

References

External links 

2003 establishments in the United States
American political blogs
Blogs critical of Islam
Counter-jihad